Group B of the 2011 Fed Cup Europe/Africa Zone Group II was one of four pools in the Europe/Africa zone of the 2011 Fed Cup. Three teams competed in a round robin competition, with the top team and the bottom team proceeding to their respective sections of the play-offs: the top teams played for advancement to Group I, while the bottom team faced potential relegation to Group III.

Georgia vs. Armenia

Bosnia and Herzegovina vs. Turkey

Georgia vs. Bosnia and Herzegovina

Armenia vs. Turkey

Georgia vs. Turkey

Armenia vs. Bosnia and Herzegovina

References

External links 
 Fed Cup website

2011 Fed Cup Europe/Africa Zone